Pittsburgh Panthers men's soccer is the NCAA Division I intercollegiate men's soccer (association football) team of the University of Pittsburgh, often referred to as "Pitt", located in Pittsburgh, Pennsylvania. The Pitt men's soccer competes in the Atlantic Coast Conference (ACC) and plays their home games at Ambrose Urbanic Field in the university's Petersen Sports Complex. Pitt soccer players have had eight selections as All-Americans and multiple former Panthers have gone on to play professionally. The Panthers have appeared in six NCAA tournaments and have reached the College Cup twice.  The Panthers have been coached by Jay Vidovich since 2015.

History
The Pitt men's soccer program has it origins in 1951 when Leo Bemis, who was then serving as Pitt's director of men's intramural sports, created a pick-up team at the university which played Slippery Rock University to a 1–1 draw. Through 1953, Bemis continued coaching the team which competed intercollegiately as a non-varsity club sport. However, Bemis was able to convince then Pitt athletic director Tom Hamilton to elevate the club team to varsity status in 1954. Despite starting with no scholarships and no feeder system in place to recruit players, Pitt's first team went 8–1 in 1954, and by 1955, the program had its first All-American selection, Jerome Bressanelli. For the first 20 years of the program, Pitt played their games at various facilities including Trees Field, Forbes Field, Kennard Field in the lower Hill District neighborhood of Pittsburgh, and even various high schools, with occasional games played at Pitt Stadium, which at the time was primarily reserved for Pitt's football team.

In 1961, the soccer program received funding to provide its first scholarships, and in 1962, Pitt earned its first bid to the NCAA soccer championship tournament, where it lost to Maryland, 3–4.  Pitt again qualified for the NCAA soccer tournament championship in 1965, but lost 0–2 on a late goal to East Stoudsburg in game played in muddy conditions at Pitt Stadium. Beginning in 1970, Pitt began play in the Western Pennsylvania Collegiate Soccer Conference (also known as the West Penn Intercollegiate Soccer Conference, or WPISC), a conference that Leo Bemis helped to found and in which he would eventually lead Pitt to a conference championship in 1981. When Pitt Stadium had artificial turf installed in 1970 and flood lighting installed in 1973, the soccer team began regularly playing its home games in the stadium, which remained its home through the 1990s.

After a 30-year tenure as head coach, Bemis was succeeded in 1984 by Joe Luxbacher, a former standout player and captain for the program who also served as an assistant under Bemis. Pitt moved from the West Penn conference to the Big East Conference for the 1985 season. In that first season in the Big East, Pitt finished atop the Big East South Division with an undefeated 4–0 record and appeared in the 1985 Big East Tournament where they lost their first game eventual Big East tournament champion Syracuse.  Pitt followed that with a second place in the South Division in 1986. Pitt would also finish second in the regular season conference standings in 1992 and 1995, years when the Big East was not broken into divisions, with Luxbacher winning Big East Coach of the Year in each of those seasons. While a member of the Big East, Pitt would advance to the Big East soccer tournament six times, including in 1995, when an injury riddled team set a program record for number of wins, including victories over 11th-ranked St. John's and fourth-ranked Rutgers. The 1995 team lost in the Big East tournament championship game to St. John's, but finished the season ranked 22nd in the nation in the final Coaches' Poll.

Following the demolition of Pitt Stadium in 1999, the soccer team moved its games to various locations, but primarily played home games at Founder's Field in Harmarville, Pennsylvania, an off-campus venue. The program returned to campus when it moved into the Petersen Sports Complex, which houses the Ambrose Urbanic Field soccer facility, in the spring of 2011. Ambrose Urbanic Field, which serves as both the practice and competition venue for the Pitt soccer team, contains 735 seats and a FIFA-certified "Duraspine" pitch. The first game held at the soccer facility was an exhibition played by the men's team against the Pittsburgh Riverhounds on March 20, 2011. The team also uses the on-campus Cost Sports Center for indoor practice during inclement weather.

In 2013, Pitt moved to the Atlantic Coast Conference (ACC), bringing the Panthers into another historically strong league with 15 national championships in men's soccer. Luxbacher retired as coach following the 2015 season. Jay Vidovich, a former national collegiate coach of the year, was hired as Pitt's head soccer coach in 2015, and led Pitt to a top 25 ranking and an NCAA tournament appearance in 2019.

Players

Current squad

Professional players

Pitt has had at least 22 former soccer players go on to play professionally.

Coaching staff

Current technical staff

Head coaches

Awards and honors

All-Americans
Pitt has had seven different players and nine all-time All-American selections.
1955 Jerome Bressanelli, halfback
1956 Jerome Bressanelli, halfback
1958 Ronald Wyatt, fullback
1959 Ronald Wyatt, fullback
1959 George Zanicoupolous, goalkeeper
1962 Paul Liberati, left halfback
1963 Dave Reichenbach, outside left
1965 George N.J. Sommer, III, left halfback
2020 Valentin Noel, midfielder
2021 Jasper Löeffelsend, defender

Big East honors
Pitt played soccer as a member of the Big East Conference from 1985 to 2012. During this time, Pitt's Joe Luxbacher won the Big East Coach of the Year award twice, Ben Garry was named to the Big East All-Rookie team, and Pitt had seven other All-Big East Team selections. Players all garnered multiple Big East Scholar-Athlete Awards with over 100 players being named Big East Academic All-Stars.

Coach of the Year
Joe Luxbacher, 1992, 1995
 

All-Rookie Team
Ben Garry, 1997

All-Big East Team selections
Charlie Wasson, B, Second Team, 1993
Jeff Porter, M, Second Team, 1995
Chris Churchill, B, Second Team, 2000
Ben Gary, M, Second Team, 2000
Justin Gaul, GK, Third Team, 2002
Keeyan Young, F, Second Team, 2003, 2004

Scholar-Athlete Award winners
Peter Veltri, 2001-02
Jacob Kring, 2004-05
Thomas DeCato, 2005-06
Brendon Smith, 2006-07
Matt Baker, 2009-10

ACC Honors 
In 2013, Pittsburgh began play in the Atlantic Coast Conference.  The Panthers did not receive an all-conference award until 2020, when they won five out of the six all-conference awards.

 ACC Coach of the Year
 Jay Vidovich, 2020, 2021

Offensive Player of the Year
 Valentin Noel, 2020

Defensive Player of the Year
 Jasper Löeffelsend, 2020, 2021

Freshman of the Year
 Bertin Jacquesson, 2020

References

External links

 

 
Association football clubs established in 1954
1954 establishments in Pennsylvania